Middleburg is a town in Loudoun County, Virginia, United States, with a population of 673 as of the 2010 census. It is the southernmost town along Loudoun County's shared border with Fauquier County.

Middleburg is known as the "Nation's Horse and Hunt Capital" for its foxhunting, steeplechases, and large estates.  The Middleburg Historic District, comprising the 19th-century center of town, is listed on the National Register of Historic Places.

History

The town was established in 1787 by American Revolutionary War Lieutenant Colonel and Virginia statesman, Leven Powell. He purchased the land for Middleburg at $2.50 per acre in 1763 from Joseph Chinn, a first cousin of George Washington. It had been called "Chinn's Crossroads", and was then called Powell Town.  When Leven Powell declined to have the town named after him, the town was called Middleburgh, and later, simply Middleburg.  The village is located midway between the port of Alexandria and Winchester, Virginia, on the Ashby Gap trading route (now followed by U.S. Route 50).

In 1863, Middleburg witnessed two skirmishes during the Gettysburg Campaign of the Civil War.

From the early 1900s, Middleburg began welcoming visitors who participated in foxhunting and steeplechasing. The village soon earned a reputation as the "Nation's Horse and Hunt Capital", attracting prominent visitors from across the U.S. Middleburg is the home of the  National Sporting Library research center for horse and field sports, which publishes Thoroughbred Heritage on the Internet. A new addition is being made to include an art gallery and museum.

In 1961, activists of the Civil Rights Movement pressed John F. Kennedy on local segregation issues during his residency outside town. That year, he and Jackie had rented Glen Ora. 

The Middleburg Historic District, comprising the 19th-century center of town, is listed on the National Register of Historic Places. The oldest building in town, the Red Fox Inn & Tavern, was originally established in 1728 by Joseph Chinn as Chinn's Ordinary and is billed as the oldest continually operated inn in the U.S.  The oldest known house still in use as a residence, "Middleburg House," was built in 1779.    Also listed on the National Register of Historic Places are Benton, the Burrland Farm Historic District, Green Pastures, Huntland, Mill House, Gen. William Mitchell House, Much Haddam, Unison Historic District, and Welbourne.

Geography
According to the United States Census Bureau, the town has a total area of 0.6 square mile (1.5 km2), all land. The elevation is 486 feet.

Transportation
U.S. Route 50 is the only primary highway directly serving Middleburg. US 50 continues westward from Middleburg to Winchester and continues west across the country, eventually reaching California. Heading east, US 50 reaches Fairfax, continues on through Washington, D.C., and eventually ends in Ocean City, Maryland.

Demographics

As of the census of 2000, there were 632 people, 322 households, and 171 families residing in the town. The population density was 1,083.8 people per square mile (420.7/km2). There were 364 housing units at an average density of 624.2 per square mile (242.3/km2). The racial makeup of the town was 76.58% White, 20.25% African American, 0.16% Asian, 1.27% from other races, and 1.74% from two or more races. Hispanic or Latino of any race were 4.27% of the population.

There were 322 households, out of which 20.2% had children under the age of 18 living with them, 33.2% were married couples living together, 14.9% had a female householder with no husband present, and 46.6% were non-families. 39.4% of all households were made up of individuals, and 15.8% had someone living alone who was 65 years of age or older. The average household size was 1.96 and the average family size was 2.57.

In the town, the population was spread out, with 16.9% under the age of 18, 5.9% from 18 to 24, 29.4% from 25 to 44, 26.1% from 45 to 64, and 21.7% who were 65 years of age or older. The median age was 44 years. For every 100 females, there were 72.7 males. For every 100 females age 18 and over, there were 71.6 males.

The median income for a household in the town was $40,625, and the median income for a family was $60,313. Males had a median income of $41,875 versus $32,708 for females. The per capita income for the town was $32,643. About 6.7% of families and 9.9% of the population were below the poverty line, including 10.7% of those under age 18 and 10.3% of those age 65 or over.

Public safety 
Middleburg is served by the Middleburg Police Department, composed of eight sworn officers and a civilian employee. It is also served by the Loudoun County Sheriff's Office.

Notable people
 Charles T. Akre, investor, financier and businessman
 Mo Alie-Cox (born 1993), American football tight end
 Bill Backer (1926-2016), advertising executive and thoroughbred owner
 Melanie Blunt, former First Lady of Missouri (2005–2009)
 Marshall Brement, U.S. Ambassador to Iceland (1981-1985), lived in Middleburg before moving to Tucson, Arizona
 Jack Kent Cooke (1912–1997), businessman and former owner of the Washington Redskins and the Los Angeles Lakers
 John L. Dagg, Baptist clergy and author, president of Mercer University from 1844 to 1854
 Robert Duvall (born 1931), award-winning American actor and director
 Edwin Broun Fred, educator
 Sam Huff (born 1934), retired Hall-of-Fame American football player for the Washington Redskins and New York Giants
 Rodney Jenkins, former show jumper
 Sheila Johnson, billionaire co-founder of BET and local real estate developer
 John F. Kennedy (1917–1963), 35th President of the United States (1961–1963), built Wexford just outside Middleburg with his wife, Jacqueline (1929–1994)
 William John Logan (1891–1977): Banker, college football player, and the 2nd Mayor of Flower Hill, New York, serving in that capacity between 1931 and 1937.
 George C. McGhee, diplomat and businessman
 Paul Mellon (1907–1999), philanthropist and race-horse breeder and owner
 Alice du Pont Mills (1912–2002), aviator, race-horse breeder and owner, environmentalist, philanthropist, and member of the Du Pont family
 Lucy Minnigerode (1871-1935), superintendent, United States Public Health Service Nursing Corps
 Wendy Pepper (1964-2017), fashion designer
 Keshia Knight Pulliam (born 1979), actress best known for her role on The Cosby Show as Rudy Huxtable
 Bruce Sundlun (1920-2011), businessman, lawyer, and former Governor of Rhode Island (1991–1995)
 Elizabeth Taylor (1932–2011), actress and activist, owned a farm with her then husband, Republican senator and former U.S. Secretary of the Navy John Warner (1927–2021)
 Frederick M. Warburg (1897–1973), investment banker, owned a horse and cattle farm
 Stephanie Zimbalist, actress best known for her role as Laura Holt on Remington Steele

Newspapers
 Middleburg Eccentric: Middleburg's only locally owned and operated newspaper.
 Middleburg Life: Monthly lifestyle publication/news service. Middleburg's oldest and most respected locally owned and operated newspaper covering the people, lifestyles, and trends of the countryside.
 Purcellville Gazette: Weekly newspaper, based in Purcellville, Virginia, serving Middleburg and western Loudoun County.

In popular culture
 Middleburg was named as the location of the mysterious crop circles in the horror film spoof Scary Movie 3 (2003).  The film shows an actual map of the Middleburg area, complete with actual surrounding towns and Route 15 pictured on the map.
 The New Hampshire scenes in the season three "Manchester" episodes of The West Wing were filmed in Middleburg.

References

 Moon, Vicky. The Middleburg Mystique: A Peek Inside the Gates of Middleburg, Virginia (2001) Capital Books  www.middleburgmystique.com
 Hunt Country Stable Tour
 Civil Rights Movement in Middleburg Virginia

External links
 

 
 Visit Middleburg
 "Middleburg Historic District", at The Journey Through Hallowed Ground Partnership, a non-profit organization dedicated to raising national awareness of the history in the region from Gettysburg, Pennsylvania to Charlottesville, Virginia

1787 establishments in Virginia
Populated places established in 1787
Towns in Loudoun County, Virginia
Towns in Virginia